Koepel Stereo (KSFM 94.9) is a South African community radio station based in the South African province Free State.

Coverage areas 
Sasolburg
Parys
Vereeniging
Heilbron
Koppies
Vredefort
Vanderbijlpark
Potchefstroom

Broadcast languages
Predominantly Afrikaans
A bit of English
A bit of Sotho

Broadcast time
24/7

Target audience
World Heritage Site of Vredefort Dome
Municipal district of Ngwathe
LSM Groups 6 - 10
Age Group 16 - 60

Programme format
20% Talk
80% Music

Listenership Figures

https://www.ksfm.co.za==References==

External links
 Official Website
 SAARF Website

Community radio stations in South Africa
Mass media in the Free State (province)